Anacampsis obscurella is a moth of the family Gelechiidae. It is found in most of Europe, except Ireland, Great Britain, the Netherlands, Portugal, Denmark, Fennoscandia, the Baltic region, Poland, Switzerland, Slovenia and Croatia.

The wingspan is 12–13 mm. Adults are on wing from June to September.

The larvae feed on Salix, Cerasus, Cotoneaster, Crataegus, Prunus domestica, Prunus spinosa and Sorbus from within a rolled leaf.

References

Moths described in 1775
Anacampsis
Moths of Europe